Guineafowl are birds of the family Numididae, including:

 Black guineafowl (Agelastes niger)
 Crested guineafowl (Guttera pucherani)
 Domesticated guineafowl
 Helmeted guineafowl (Numida meleagris)
 Plumed guineafowl (Guttera plumifera)
 Vulturine guineafowl (Acryllium vulturinum)
 White-breasted guineafowl (Agelastes meleagrides)

Guineafowl may also refer to:

 Arothron meleagris, the guineafowl pufferfish
 Hamanumida daedalus, the guineafowl butterfly

Animal common name disambiguation pages